The 2010 TAC Cup season was the 19th season of the TAC Cup competition. Calder Cannons have won there 6th premiership title after defeating Gippsland Power in the grand final by a 58 points.

Ladder

Grand final

References 

NAB League
Nab League